Abantis eltringhami is a butterfly in the  family Hesperiidae. It is found in Cameroon.

References

Endemic fauna of Cameroon
Butterflies described in 1932
Tagiadini
Insects of Cameroon
Butterflies of Africa